GSAT-18 is an Indian communications satellite. Built by ISRO and operated by INSAT, it carries 24 C-band, 12 extended C-band, and 12 Ku-band transponders.

The satellite was launched on 5 October 2016 at approximately 20:30 UTC aboard an Ariane 5 ECA rocket from the Guiana Space Centre in Kourou, French Guiana. The launch vehicle inserted the satellite into a geosynchronous transfer orbit, and once in service it will occupy the orbital slot at 74° East longitude.

GSAT-18 was originally scheduled to launch on 12 July 2016 alongside Japan's Superbird-8 satellite, but a shipping mishap which damaged Superbird-8 forced a delay in the launch schedule. Arianespace later paired GSAT-18 with Australia's Sky Muster II for a 4 October 2016 launch. The launch was delayed 24 hours to 5 October due to excessively high crosswinds at the launch site.

Orbit raising and station keeping 
Orbit raising operations were made using an on-board LAM and chemical thrusters to place the satellite in the intended geostationary orbital slot.

References 

GSAT satellites
Spacecraft launched by India in 2016
Ariane commercial payloads